Alan Ling Sie Kiong (born 19 February 1983) is a Malaysian politician and lawyer who served as Senator from August 2018 to August 2021 and Member of the Sarawak State Legislative Assembly (MLA) for Piasau from April 2011 to May 2016. He is the State Secretary of Sarawak of both the Democratic Action Party (DAP) as well as its coalition, the state opposition Pakatan Harapan (PH) coalition.

He spent his childhood in Nanga Medamit, Limbang, Sarawak where his parents started their first business venture by operating a small grocery shops next to a river in the rural area. He is a Christian.

Ling received his primary education in SRB Chung Hua Limbang, North School Miri and secondary school in SMK St. Joseph Miri.

Ling graduated from the University of Sheffield with a Bachelor of Laws honours degree. During his stay in United Kingdom, he was the President of Malaysian Law Students Union in the United Kingdom and Eire (KPUM) for the term 2004/2005. He also held the post of President for Malaysian Chinese Association (MCA) Club of United Kingdom for the term 2005/2006.

He is an Advocate & Solicitor of the High Court in Malaya and High Court in Sabah and Sarawak. Ling became the managing partner of an established law firm Suhaili & Ling Advocates in Miri at the age of 27. He has particular interest in criminal law and was a pupil to the late Karpal Singh. He is also the partner of Rohamat & Ling which is situated in Petaling Jaya and Johor Bahru in West Malaysia. He is a well-known lawyer in Miri and has been appointed honourable/legal advisors to several associations in Miri.

Besides legal qualification, he is a licensed auctioneer, company secretary and also actively involved in the business field since his university time. At the age of 25 in 2008, he successfully obtained license from Bank Negara Malaysia to operate remittance business in partnership with Western Union, it is one of the pioneers non-bank remittance operators in Malaysia. In 2015, he sold the company operation to another remittance operator.

Ling joined DAP in 2011 and had been elected Honourable Member of the Sarawak State Legislative Assembly for Piasau. He won the seat at the age of 28 by upsetting the then Sarawak Deputy Chief Minister cum President of Sarawak United People's Party (SUPP) of Barisan Nasional (BN), Tan Sri Dr George Chan Hong Nam in the 2011 state election. He defeated Chan by a 1,590-vote majority. Ling is a charismatic young politician and has been widely known for his excellent oratory skill, down to earth approach and dedication towards his constituents. He has a community centre within his constituency. He seek for re-election in 2016 state election but lost to BN SUPP candidate. His focus is now on his legal practice, business interest and party works.

Currently he is also one of the board members to Malaysian Palm Oil Board (MPOB). Ling was appointed and sworn in as Malaysian Senator in Dewan Negara on 27 August 2018.

In June 2019, Ling was appointed as president of Miri Volleyball Association (MVA).

References

1983 births
Living people
People from Sarawak
Malaysian people of Chinese descent
21st-century Malaysian lawyers
Malaysian businesspeople
Democratic Action Party (Malaysia) politicians
Members of the Sarawak State Legislative Assembly
Members of the Dewan Negara
Alumni of the University of Sheffield
21st-century Malaysian politicians